Éric Werner (born 1940) is a Swiss philosopher, journalist and essayist.

Biography 
He studied at the Institut d'Études Politiques de Paris. He is a retired professor of the University of Geneva.

Works 

 De la violence au totalitarisme, essai sur la pensée de Camus et de Sartre, Calmann-Lévy, Paris, 1972.
 Mystique et politique : études de philosophie politique, L'Âge d'Homme, Lausanne et Paris, 1979, .
 Jan Marejko and Éric Werner, De la misère intellectuelle et morale en Suisse romande [nouvelle édition, avec une postface d'Éric Werner], L'Âge d'Homme, Lausanne et Paris, 1981,
 Le système de trahison, L'Âge d'Homme, Lausanne et Paris, 1986, .
 Ne dites surtout pas que je doute, on finirait par le croire : à propos de l'« affaire Paschoud », Thaël, Lausanne, 1988,
 Vous avez dit guerre civile ?, Thaël, Lausanne, 1990,
 De l'extermination, Thaël, Lausanne, 1993,
 Montaigne stratège, L'Âge d'Homme, Lausanne et Paris, 1996, .
 L'Avant-guerre civile, L'Âge d'Homme, Lausanne et Paris, 1999, .
 L'Après-démocratie, L'Âge d'Homme, Lausanne et Paris, 2001, .
 La Maison de servitude : Réplique au Grand Inquisiteur, éditions Xenia, Vevey, 2006, .
 Ne vous approchez pas des fenêtres : Indiscrétions sur la nature réelle du régime, Xénia, Vevey, 2008, .

References

Swiss journalists
Swiss philosophers
Swiss essayists
1940 births
Living people
Sciences Po alumni
Academic staff of the University of Geneva
Swiss expatriates in France